The 1934 VFL Grand Final was an Australian rules football game contested between the Richmond Football Club and South Melbourne Football Club, held at the Melbourne Cricket Ground in Melbourne on 13 October 1934. It was the 36th annual Grand Final of the Victorian Football League, staged to determine the premiers for the 1934 VFL season. The match, attended by 65,335 spectators, was won by Richmond by a margin of 39 points, marking that club's fourth VFL/AFL premiership victory.

This was the second successive year in which the two teams met in the premiership decider, with South Melbourne having won the 1933 VFL Grand Final. It was also the seventh occasion in eight years that Richmond had appeared in a Grand Final. It had won just one of those earlier contests, in 1932.

Score

Teams

 Umpire – Bob Scott

Statistics

Goalkickers

See also
 1934 VFL season

References
AFL Tables: 1934 Grand Final
 The Official statistical history of the AFL 2004 
 Ross, J. (ed), 100 Years of Australian Football 1897-1996: The Complete Story of the AFL, All the Big Stories, All the Great Pictures, All the Champions, Every AFL Season Reported, Viking, (Ringwood), 1996. 

VFL/AFL Grand Finals
Grand
Richmond Football Club
Sydney Swans
October 1934 sports events